Gowy Daraq-e Olya (also Romanized as Gowy Daraq-e ‘Olyā; also known as Gowy Daraq-e Bālā) is a village in Sarajuy-ye Shomali Rural District, in the Central District of Maragheh County, East Azerbaijan Province, Iran. At the 2006 census, its population was 33, in 10 families.

References 

Towns and villages in Maragheh County